IK Tellus Bandy is the bandy department of IK Tellus.

In bandy, the club had been playing in Elitserien, the first tier in the Swedish bandy league system. since the 2021/22 season, having been promoted from Allsvenskan.

When IFK Kungälv was kicked out of top-tier Elitserien from the 2016–17 season for not fulfilling the requirements for elite licence, IK Tellus was given their Elitserien spot. Tellus was second last of the teams in Elitserien and had to play for re-qualification, and managed to qualify for the 2017–18 Elitserien too.

References

Sport in Stockholm
Bandy clubs established in 1921
Bandy clubs in Sweden
1921 establishments in Sweden